"Warm Smiles Do Not Make You Welcome Here" is a  single by British rock band Enter Shikari from their 2012 album A Flash Flood of Colour. The song's title is a re-used title from an old song played by the band in their early days.

Music video
The music video alternates between the band performing in a warehouse and company executives mass-producing clones of the band. The band then perform energetically opposite a lifeless version of themselves, before detonating an explosive and destroying the chimneys, polluting the air in the distance, seen in the sunglasses of the company executive. The video was released on the band's official YouTube page on 2 July 2012. The video was directed by Raul Gonzo and produced by Robby Starbuck. Extra video work was done by KODE Media.

Track listing

Band members
Roughton "Rou" Reynolds – lead vocals, synthesizer, keyboards, programming
Chris Batten – bass guitar, backing vocals
Liam "Rory" Clewlow – guitar, backing vocals
Rob Rolfe – drums, percussion, backing vocals

References

Enter Shikari songs
2012 singles
2012 songs